Muelle de Gallineras is a fishing port and marina located in San Fernando in the Province of Cádiz, Andalusia, Spain. It was used in Roman times. On 23 October 304, Calventius Viator sailed from here to Africa after being martyred. During the French siege there were two defensive batteries, one lower and one higher. Gallerinas today is also the name of a district (barrio) of the city.

References

Buildings and structures in San Fernando, Cádiz
Ports and harbours of the Spanish Atlantic coast
Forts in Spain